Battering Ram is the fifth studio album by the German power metal band Iron Savior. It is the first album to feature bassist Yenz Leonhardt.

Track listing

Reception

The album was released to generally favorable reviews, with reviewers citing the band for remaining faithful to the genre of Power Metal. Allmusic gave the album 3 1/2 stars, with Alex Henderson stating that "Everything on this CD sounds like it could have been recorded 20 or 25 years earlier, which is just as well, because Savior's members are undeniably good at what they do. No one will accuse Savior of being the most groundbreaking band in the world, but in terms of quality and craftsmanship, they deliver the goods -- and what they lack in originality, they more than make up for with passion and conviction".

Personnel
Iron Savior
 Piet Sielcklead vocals, guitar, backing vocals
 Joachim "Piesel" Küstnerguitar, backing vocals
 Yenz Leonhardtbass, backing vocals
 Thomas Nackdrums, percussion, backing vocals

Additional musicians
 Martin Christian (Paragon)guitar solo on "Wings of Deliverance"

Production
 Piet Sielckproducer, engineer, mixing, mastering
 Iron Savioradditional production
 Marko Jakobicover artwork
 Marisa Jacobigraphic design
 Olle Carlssonphotography

Additional information
 Drums recorded by Piet Sielck at KARO Studio, Brackel, Germany in October 2003.

References

Iron Savior albums
2004 albums
Noise Records albums